Puketapu  is a rural community in the Hastings District and Hawke's Bay Region of New Zealand's North Island.

It is located west of Napier and north of Hastings.

In February 2023 Puketapu was severely effected by flooding from Cyclone Gabrielle. Water from the Tutaekuri River rose above homes and damaged much of the agricultural land.

Marae

The community has four Ngāti Kahungunu marae:
 Hamuera or Moteo Marae and Rangimarie meeting house is a meeting place of Ngāti Hinepare and Ngāti Māhu.
 Rūnanga Marae and Te Aroha  meeting house is a meeting place of Ngāi Te Ūpokoiri, Ngāti Hinemanu and Ngāti Mahuika.
 Timikara Marae and Te Whānau Pani meeting house is a meeting place of Ngāti Hinepare and Ngāti Māhu.
 Wharerangi Marae and Manahau meeting house is a meeting place of Tāwhao and Ngāti Hinepare. The new Manahau meeting house opened in 2022.

In October 2020, the Government committed $6,020,910 from the Provincial Growth Fund to upgrade a group of 18 marae, including the four Puketapu marae. The funding was expected to create 39 jobs.

Education

References

Hastings District
Populated places in the Hawke's Bay Region